The Lie is a 2018 psychological horror film written and directed by Veena Sud. The film is a remake of the 2015 German film We Monsters, and stars Mireille Enos, Peter Sarsgaard and Joey King. Jason Blum serves as a producer under his Blumhouse Television banner.

The Lie premiered at the Toronto International Film Festival on September 13, 2018. It was later released on October 6, 2020, by Amazon Studios, as the first installment in the anthological Welcome to the Blumhouse film series.

Plot  

Divorced father Jay drives his daughter Kayla to a ballet retreat. On the way, they find Kayla's friend, Britney, on the side of the road, and give her a lift to the same retreat. After pulling over so Britney can go to the bathroom in the woods, Jay hears Kayla scream and finds her sitting alone on a bridge over a river. Kayla claims she pushed Britney off the bridge. Jay checks the area for Britney's body, but does not find it and assumes she drowned and was washed away. Kayla finds Britney's purse and they go to see her mother, Rebecca, an attorney.

At Rebecca's home, Kayla tells her that she murdered Britney. Britney's father, Sam, arrives in search for his daughter. When he asks to speak to Kayla, Rebecca lies, saying she is at the doctor. Later on, Sam gets suspicious and returns to discover that Rebecca lied and Kayla is at home. After a physical altercation with Jay, Sam threatens to go to the police. Noting that Britney had a bruise on her face, Jay convinces Rebecca to try and put suspicion on Sam for the disappearance. She contacts a police associate, Detective Kenji Tagata, to accuse Sam of abusing Britney. When Kenji interrogates Sam, he denies hitting Britney and admits that she has run away before. Kenji interviews Kayla, who says that Sam has a bad temper and hit Britney before.

Sam spots Kayla outside Jay's apartment and tries to grab her, but she retreats back into the house as he is chasing her, banging on the windows, and screaming her name. Jay and Rebecca try to bury Britney's phone behind Sam's house, but he catches them in the act. Before they flee, Sam tells them that he knows Kayla killed Britney. When Sam appears in front of their car, Rebecca purposefully drives into him. Jay and Rebecca consider calling for help before letting him bleed to death and leaving his corpse in the road.

The next morning, as Jay and Rebecca scrub Sam's blood off her car, Britney suddenly appears, alive and well, asking to speak to Kayla. Britney admits her disappearance was no more than an elaborate ruse between her and Kayla to allow for Britney to visit her boyfriend. Britney becomes uncomfortable and leaves after noticing a bloodied rag, and their suspicious reactions. Jay and Rebecca confront Kayla, who tearfully admits that she went along with Britney's plan, and escalated the lie by pretending to "push" Britney off the bridge, hoping that the pseudo-tragedy would bring her divorced parents back together. As the family embrace and Kayla begs her parents not to leave her, the doorbell rings and incoming police sirens are heard.

Cast

Production 
Principal photography on the film began in January 2018. Its working title was Between the Earth and the Sky. The film is set in New York and filmed Toronto area.

Release 
The film premiered at the Toronto International Film Festival on September 13, 2018. In August 2020, Amazon Studios acquired distribution rights to the film, and premiered it on October 6, 2020. Along with Black Box, it's one of the first two movies released from Blumhouse Productions's 8-film anthology Welcome to the Blumhouse.

Reception 
The website's critics consensus reads, "Queasily compelling without ever truly coming together, The Lie won't fool many viewers seeking worthwhile horror fare." On Metacritic, the film has a weighted average score of 45 out of 100, based on 13 critics, indicating "mixed or average reviews".

References

External links 
 

2010s psychological horror films
2010s teen horror films
2018 films
2018 horror thriller films
2018 psychological thriller films
Amazon Studios films
American horror thriller films
American psychological horror films
American psychological thriller films
American remakes of German films
American teen horror films
Blumhouse Productions films
Canadian horror thriller films
Canadian psychological horror films
Films produced by Jason Blum
Films scored by Tamar-kali
Films set in Canada
Films shot in Ontario
Remakes of German films
2010s English-language films
Amazon Prime Video original films
2010s Canadian films
2010s American films